Jack Joseph Kempf (May 12, 1935 - July 1, 2003) was a business owner and politician in British Columbia. He represented Omineca in the Legislative Assembly of British Columbia from 1975 to 1991 as a Social Credit member.

He was born in Kelowna, British Columbia, the son of Steve Kempf and Katherine Klein. Kempf was a motel and restaurant owner. He served on the municipal council for Houston, British Columbia and also served as mayor. Kempf served in the provincial cabinet, first as Minister of Lands, Parks and Housing, and then as Minister of Forests and Lands.

Kempf died in Loreto, Baja California Sur, Mexico, where he had lived in retirement.

References 

1935 births
2003 deaths
British Columbia municipal councillors
British Columbia Social Credit Party MLAs
Businesspeople from British Columbia
Canadian hoteliers
Canadian restaurateurs
Mayors of places in British Columbia
Members of the Executive Council of British Columbia
People from Kelowna
People from Loreto Municipality, Baja California Sur
20th-century Canadian politicians